Richard Antonio Carapaz Montenegro (born 29 May 1993) is an Ecuadorian professional road racing cyclist who currently rides for UCI WorldTeam . Carapaz won the 2019 Giro d'Italia, becoming the first Ecuadorian rider to win the race. In July 2021, he won the gold medal in the road race at the 2020 Summer Olympics, becoming the first Ecuadorian cyclist to win a medal and only the second Ecuadorian in any sport to win a gold medal at the Olympic Games. In doing so, he became the first cyclist to achieve an Olympic road race gold medal and a podium finish in each of the three Grand Tours.

Early life 
Carapaz was born in El Carmelo, Tulcán Canton. Whilst at school, he was mentored by one of his teachers, former Olympic racing cyclist Juan Carlos Rosero, who started a cycling club at the school. The club has also produced a number of other professional riders, including Jhonatan Narváez and Jonathan Caicedo. Prior to taking up cycling, Carapaz competed for his school as a runner.

Career

Movistar Team (2016–2019)

2016 
Carapaz began his career with amateur teams in Ecuador, Colombia and Spain. He signed as a professional rider ahead of the 2017 season.

2017 
He made his Grand Tour debut in the Vuelta a España, finishing 36th overall.

2018 
His first professional victories came in 2018, with a stage and the overall in the Vuelta a Asturias. He won stage 8 of the Giro d'Italia, becoming the first Ecuadorian cyclist to win a Grand Tour stage. He finished in the top ten in five other stages of that race, and finished fourth in the general classification. He also completed the 2018 Vuelta a España in 18th place.

2019 

Carapaz again won the Vuelta a Asturias in 2019, and went on to win the 2019 Giro d'Italia. After multiple crashes late in stage 4 saw several riders go down and a select group break off on the front, Carapaz made an attack in the final kilometre to take the stage win. On Stage 13, Carapaz attacked and got clear of the two favourites for overall victory, Vincenzo Nibali and Primož Roglič. This placed him among the other favourites, two minutes down on Roglič. On stage 14, Carapaz again attacked and won the stage by almost two minutes, taking the general classification lead. Carapaz successfully defended his lead for the rest of the race to take the overall victory. Carapaz became the first Ecuadorian rider to win a Grand Tour and the second South American rider to win the Giro, after Colombian Nairo Quintana in 2014.

Team Ineos (2020–2022)

2020 
Carapaz joined  at the beginning of the 2020 season on a three-year deal.  His first win for the team came on 7 August, on the third stage of the Tour de Pologne: on the uphill drag to the finish, Carapaz made an attack in the final kilometre and held off the peloton. In the Tour de France, he came second in both stages 16 and 18. On the latter stage, he finished alongside teammate Michał Kwiatkowski, who won the stage, while Carapaz took the lead in the mountains classification from Tadej Pogačar. However, two days later, Pogačar retook the lead, and also won the stage and moved into the overall race lead; Carapaz ultimately finished second in the mountains classification.

In the Vuelta a España, Carapaz was once again a challenger for overall victory and traded places with defending champion Primož Roglič several times for the race lead. He first took the red jersey of the race leader on stage 6 from Roglič. On stage 10, Carapaz relinquished it back to Roglič, who won the day's stage, though the two were tied on time and had to be differentiated by tiebreakers. Carapaz regained the race lead briefly after stage 12, but lost it for good to Roglič after the thirteenth stage. On the mountainous penultimate stage, with Roglič, Carapaz, and Hugh Carthy locked in a three-way battle for the overall victory, Carapaz attacked but only managed to take 15 seconds on Carthy and 21 seconds on Roglič. In doing so, he secured a second place overall finish.

2021 
Carapaz took his first victory of the 2021 season on 10 June, winning the mountainous fifth stage of the Tour de Suisse. In so doing, he took the general classification lead, which he defended over the remaining five stages to take the overall win by 17 seconds ahead of Rigoberto Urán.

Carapaz was named to the 's Tour de France squad as one of four possible contenders for the general classification alongside Tao Geoghegan Hart, Richie Porte, and Tour winner Geraint Thomas. After the other three riders were involved in crashes and lost time in the first week, Carapaz emerged as the sole leader. He would eventually finish third overall.

Carapaz won the Olympic road race, finishing over a minute clear of the rest of the field.

2022 
Carapaz began the 2022 season at the Étoile de Bessèges in early February, in which he crashed during stage 3 and abandoned prior to the last stage, having already lost over nine minutes to eventual winner Benjamin Thomas. His bad luck continued at the Tour de la Provence about a week later, from which he was forced to withdraw after testing positive for COVID-19 despite showing no symptoms. However, Carapaz took his first win of the season later that month at the Ecuadorian National Time Trial Championships, which was also his first national title at the elite level. His next important success came during stage 6 of the 2022 Volta a Catalunya when he went on a long-distance attack with Sergio Higuita. The pair stayed away for over 100 kilometers and raced all the way to the line with Carapaz taking the stage win and moving into 2nd on GC.

EF Education-EasyPost

2023
On 19 August 2022 it was announced Carapaz would join  from the 2023 season on a three-year contract.

Major results

2010
 1st  Road race, National Junior Road Championships
2013
 1st  Road race, Pan American Under-23 Road Championships
 2nd Overall Vuelta al Ecuador
 9th Overall Tour de Savoie Mont-Blanc
 9th Overall Vuelta a Guatemala
2014
 2nd Overall Vuelta al Ecuador
2015
 1st  Overall Vuelta de la Juventud de Colombia
1st Stages 3 & 4
 1st Stage 4 Clásico RCN
2016
 1st  Overall Vuelta a Navarra
1st Stage 2
2017
 2nd Overall Route du Sud
1st  Young rider classification
 2nd GP Industria & Artigianato di Larciano
 4th Overall Vuelta a Castilla y León
 6th Overall Vuelta a la Comunidad de Madrid
2018
 1st  Overall Vuelta a Asturias
1st Stage 2
 3rd Overall Settimana Internazionale di Coppi e Bartali
 4th Overall Giro d'Italia
1st Stage 8
Held  after Stages 6–13
 5th Circuito de Getxo
2019
 1st  Overall Giro d'Italia
1st Stages 4 & 14
 1st  Overall Vuelta a Asturias
1st  Points classification
1st Stage 2
 3rd Overall Vuelta a Burgos
 6th Overall Vuelta a San Juan
 9th Overall Tour Colombia
2020
 1st Stage 3 Tour de Pologne
 2nd Overall Vuelta a España
Held  after Stages 6–9 & 12
Held  after Stages 2–4
 6th Overall Vuelta a Burgos
 Tour de France
Held  after Stages 18–19
 Combativity award Stage 16
2021
 1st  Road race, Olympic Games
 1st  Overall Tour de Suisse
1st Stage 5
 3rd Overall Tour de France
 9th La Flèche Wallonne
2022
 National Road Championships
1st  Time trial
2nd Road race
 Vuelta a España
1st  Mountains classification
1st Stages 12, 14 & 20
 2nd Overall Giro d'Italia
Held  after Stages 14–19
 2nd Overall Volta a Catalunya
1st Stage 6
2023
 1st  Road race, National Road Championships

General classification results timeline

Major championships timeline

References

External links

1993 births
Cyclists at the 2020 Summer Olympics
Ecuadorian Giro d'Italia stage winners
Ecuadorian Vuelta a España stage winners
Ecuadorian male cyclists
Giro d'Italia winners
Living people
Medalists at the 2020 Summer Olympics
Olympic cyclists of Ecuador
Olympic gold medalists for Ecuador
Olympic medalists in cycling
People from Tulcán
Tour de Suisse stage winners
21st-century Ecuadorian people